Scar End is a settlement on the side of Twistleton Scar in the English county of North Yorkshire. 

This Scar itself is the end of a spur running westwards from Whernside, one of the Three Peaks, towards Ingleton, North Yorkshire.  Looking out towards the west from Twistleton Scar is Ingleton and to the South, is Ingleborough.  The settlement consists of five properties, Twistleton Farm, Near Barn, Far Barn, Scar End Barn, Scar End Cottage 1 and Scar End Cottage 2.

Visitors walking the Ingleton Waterfalls Trail will approach Scar End by walking along Twistleton Lane.

References

Peaks of the Yorkshire Dales